Jeremy Finello (born 13 May 1992) is a Swiss biathlete. He competed in the 2018 Winter Olympics.

Biathlon results
All results are sourced from the International Biathlon Union.

World Championships
0 medals

*During Olympic seasons competitions are only held for those events not included in the Olympic program.
**The single mixed relay was added as an event in 2019.

References

1992 births
Living people
Biathletes at the 2018 Winter Olympics
Swiss male biathletes
Olympic biathletes of Switzerland